Bertamyia notata is a species of flat-footed flies (insects in the family Platypezidae) found in the Americas (Canada to Argentina).

References

Further reading

External links

 

Platypezidae
Platypezoidea genera
Articles created by Qbugbot